Apollo's Fire: Igniting America's Clean Energy Economy is a 2007 book by Washington State Governor Jay Inslee and researcher Bracken Hendricks. Inslee first proposed an Apollo-scale program, designed to galvanize the nation around the urgent goal of solving the environmental and energy crisis, in the Seattle Post-Intelligencer in 2002. Eventually Inslee co-authored Apollo's Fire, in which he says that through improved Federal policies the United States can wean itself off of its dependence on foreign oil and fossil fuel, create millions of green-collar worker jobs, and stop global warming. Along these lines, he has been a prominent supporter of the Apollo Alliance.

In "Chapter 2:  Reinventing the car", Apollo's Fire highlights such innovative efforts such as CalCars, founded in 2002 to promote plug-in hybrid electric vehicles (PHEVs), charged by off-peak electricity from renewable energy sources, as a key to addressing oil dependence and global warming worldwide.

Details
Jay Inslee and Bracken Hendricks, Apollo's Fire: Igniting America's Clean Energy Economy, Island Press (October 1, 2007),

See also

List of books about renewable energy
List of books about energy issues
Renewable energy commercialization
Sustainable business

References

2007 non-fiction books
Books about energy issues
Energy economics
Jay Inslee
Renewable energy commercialization
Sustainability books
Island Press books